The Regional Government of Castile-La Mancha is the institution whereby the government of the autonomous community of Castile-La Mancha, Spain, is organized. It is integrated by the:
 Parliament of Castile-La Mancha (Cortes de Castilla-La Mancha);
 the President of Castile-La Mancha; and
 the Council of Government (the executive).

The Cortes of Castile-La Mancha are the legislative assembly of the autonomous community, in charge of creating legislation and appointing or dismissing the President of the Regional Government. The President is the representative of the autonomous community, usually the leader of the party or coalition with the majority of seats in the assembly. The President heads the Council of Government, the organization in charge of the executive branch of government. It is integrated by several councilors appointed by the President.

See also 
 Second García-Page Government (incumbent)

References